A testing reliability is a set of two probabilities, the definition of which varies by field.  In medicine, the sensitivity and specificity are conventionally used.  In the field of defect detection testing, the probabilities of detection and false call are conventionally used.

Product testing